Amir Hassan Ferdos  (29 September 1929 – 1997) was an Iranian lightweight weightlifter. In 1951 he won a gold medal at the Asian Games and a bronze at the world championships. Next year he placed fifth at the 1952 Summer Olympics.

References

1929 births
1997 deaths
Iranian male weightlifters
Olympic weightlifters of Iran
Weightlifters at the 1952 Summer Olympics
Medalists at the 1951 Asian Games
Asian Games gold medalists for Iran
Weightlifters at the 1951 Asian Games
Asian Games medalists in weightlifting
World Weightlifting Championships medalists
20th-century Iranian people